Gone Girl is the 58th album by American country singer Johnny Cash, released on Columbia Records in 1978. It features The Rolling Stones' Beggars Banquet song "No Expectations", the original "It Comes and Goes" and Rodney Crowell's "A Song for the Life", as well as a version of Kenny Rogers' famous single "The Gambler", released just a month before Gone Girl. Three singles from the album, "Gone Girl", "I Will Rock and Roll with You" and "It'll Be Her", were released, but did not reach the country chart's top 20.

Track listing

Personnel
 Johnny Cash – vocals, guitar
 Marshall Grant – bass
 W.S. Holland – drums
 Bob Wootton – electric guitar
 Jimmy Capps, Tommy Allsup – acoustic guitar
 Jack Clement – rhythm guitar
 Earl Ball – piano
 Jerry Hensley – electric and acoustic guitar
 Jack Hale, Bob Lewin – trumpet
 Jo-El Sonnier – concertina, harmonica
 Terry Jacks – guitar
 The Carter Family, Jan Howard, The Jordanaires, Rosanne Cash – backing vocals
 The Shelly Kurland Strings – strings
 Bill Justis - string arrangements on "Gone Girl", "The Diplomat", "It'll Be Her" and "A Sing for the Life" 
Technical
 Produced by Larry Butler
 Billy Sherrill, Charlie Bradley, Charlie Bragg, Jerry Watson - engineer
Virginia Team - art direction
Norman Seeff - photography

Charts
Singles - Billboard (United States)

References

External links
 Luma Electronic entry on Gone Girl

1978 albums
Columbia Records albums
Johnny Cash albums
Albums arranged by Bill Justis
Albums produced by Larry Butler (producer)